Butylated hydroxytoluene (BHT), also known as dibutylhydroxytoluene, is a lipophilic organic compound, chemically a derivative of phenol, that is useful for its antioxidant properties. BHT is widely used to prevent free radical-mediated oxidation in fluids (e.g. fuels, oils) and other materials, and the regulations overseen by the U.S. F.D.A.—which considers BHT to be "generally recognized as safe"—allow small amounts to be added to foods. Despite this, and the earlier determination by the National Cancer Institute that BHT was noncarcinogenic in an animal model, societal concerns over its broad use have been expressed. BHT has also been postulated as an antiviral drug, but as of December 2022 , use of BHT as a drug is not supported by the scientific literature and it has not been approved by any drug regulatory agency for use as an antiviral.

Natural occurrence 
Phytoplankton, including the green algae Botryococcus braunii, as well as three different cyanobacteria (Cylindrospermopsis raciborskii, Microcystis aeruginosa and Oscillatoria sp.) are capable of producing BHT as a natural product. The fruit lychee also produces BHT in its pericarp. Several fungi (for example Aspergillus conicus) living in olives produce BHT.

Production

Biosynthesis

Industrial production
The chemical synthesis of BHT in industry has involved the reaction of p-cresol (4-methylphenol) with isobutylene (2-methylpropene), catalyzed by sulfuric acid:

CH3(C6H4)OH  +  2 CH2=C(CH3)2  →  ((CH3)3C)2CH3C6H2OH
Alternatively, BHT has been prepared from 2,6-di-tert-butylphenol by hydroxymethylation or aminomethylation followed by hydrogenolysis.

Reactions 

The species behaves as a synthetic analog of vitamin E, primarily acting as a terminating agent that suppresses autoxidation, a process whereby unsaturated (usually) organic compounds are attacked by atmospheric oxygen.  BHT stops this autocatalytic reaction by converting peroxy radicals to hydroperoxides.  It effects this function by donating a hydrogen atom:
RO2•  +  ArOH  →  ROOH  +  ArO•
RO2•  +  ArO•  →  nonradical products
where R is alkyl or aryl, and where ArOH is BHT or related phenolic antioxidants.  Each BHT consumes two peroxy radicals.

Applications 
BHT is listed by the NIH Hazardous Substances Data Bank under several categories in catalogues and databases, such as food additive, household product ingredient, industrial additive, personal care product/cosmetic ingredient, pesticide ingredient, plastic/rubber ingredient and medical/veterinary/research.

Food additive 
BHT is primarily used as an antioxidant food additive. In the United States, it is classified as generally recognized as safe (GRAS) based on a National Cancer Institute study from 1979 in rats and mice. It is approved for use in the U.S. by the Food and Drug Administration: For example, 21 CFR § 137.350(a)(4) allows BHT up to 0.0033% by weight in "enriched rice", while 9 CFR § 381.147](f)(1) allows up to 0.01% in poultry "by fat content". It is permitted in the European Union under E321.

BHT is used as a preservative ingredient in some foods. With this usage BHT maintains freshness or prevents spoilage; it may be used to decrease the rate at which the texture, color, or flavor of food changes.

Some food companies have voluntarily eliminated BHT from their products or have announced that they were going to phase it out.

Antioxidant 

BHT is also used as an antioxidant in products such as metalworking fluids, cosmetics, pharmaceuticals, rubber, transformer oils, and embalming fluid. In the petroleum industry, where BHT is known as the fuel additive AO-29, it is used in hydraulic fluids, turbine and gear oils, and jet fuels.  BHT is also used to prevent peroxide formation in organic ethers and other solvents and laboratory chemicals. It is added to certain monomers as a polymerisation inhibitor to facilitate their safe storage. Some additive products contain BHT as their primary ingredient, while others contain the chemical merely as a component of their formulation, sometimes alongside butylated hydroxyanisole (BHA).

Health effects 

The US Food and Drug Administration classifies BHT as generally recognized as safe (GRAS) as a food preservative when used according in an approved manner. In 1979, the National Cancer Institute determined that BHT was noncarcinogenic in a mouse model.

Nevertheless, the World Health Organization discussed a possible link between BHT and cancer risk in 1986, and some primary research studies in the 1970s–1990s reported both potential for increased risk and potential for decreased risk in the area of oncology. Because of this uncertainty, the Center for Science in the Public Interest puts BHT in its "caution" column and recommends avoiding it.

Based on various, disparate primary research reports, BHT has been suggested to have anti-viral activity, and the reports divide into various study types. First, there are studies that describe virus inactivation—where treatment with the chemical results in disrupted or otherwise inactivated virus particles. The action of BHT in these is akin to the action of many other organic compounds, e.g., quaternary ammonium compounds, phenolics, and detergents, which disrupt viruses by insertion of the chemical into the virus membrane, coat, or other structure, which are established methods of viral disinfection secondary to methods of chemical oxidation and UV irradiation. In addition, there is a report of BHT use, topically against genital herpes lesions, a report of inhibitory activity in vitro against pseudorabies (in cell culture), and two studies, in veterinary contexts, of use of BHT to attempt to protect against virus exposure (pseudorabies in mouse and swine, and Newcastle in chickens). The relevance of other reports, regarding influenza in mice, is not easily discerned. Notably, this series of primary research reports does not support a general conclusion of independent confirmation of the original research results, nor are there critical reviews appearing thereafter, in secondary sources, for the various host-virus systems studied with BHT.

Hence, at present, the results do not present a scientific consensus in favour of the conclusion of the general antiviral potential of BHT when dosed in humans. Moreover, as of March 2020, no guidance from any of the internationally recognized associations of infectious disease specialists had advocated use of BHT products as an antiviral therapy or prophylactic.

References

External links 
 Chemistry of BHA and BHT Food Preservatives
 CDC – NIOSH Pocket Guide to Chemical Hazards

Natural phenols
Antioxidants
Alkylphenols
Fuel antioxidants
Food antioxidants
Tert-butyl compounds
E-number additives